Walter Ross Taylor (1805–1896) was a Scottish minister of the Free Church of Scotland who served as Moderator of the General Assembly 1884/85.

Life

He was born in Tain in northern Scotland on 11 November 1805 the son of the sheriff clerk of Cromarty. His mother Flora Ross was sister of Col Walter Ross of Nigg House and inherited the house on his death. The house held feudal superiority over the village of Nigg.

Walter was educated at the Royal Academy in Tain then from 1819 studied at King's College, Aberdeen winning the Hutton Prize as best 4th year student. He then studied to be a minister at the Divinity Hall in Aberdeen, Edinburgh and Glasgow to train as a minister for the Church of Scotland. He was ordained at Chadwell Street Church in Islington in London in 1829.

In 1831 he became minister of Old Saint Peter's in Thurso.  In 1832, the new parish church (pictured) was consecrated.

In the Disruption of 1843 he left the established church to join the Free Church of Scotland. A large part of his congregation left with him. A new church was built almost immediately. A new manse was built in 1850. The church was rebuilt in 1875.

In 1884 he succeeded Rev Horatius Bonar as Moderator of the General Assembly. He was succeeded in turn in 1885 by Rev David Brown.

From 1894 he was assisted by Rev George Herbert Morrison. He died on 5 October 1896 aged 90 and Morrison then took his place, building the Thurso Mission Hall soon thereafter.

The Thurso church was replaced in the 1970s by a new building.

Works

The Reception  of  the  Gospel  and  a  Conversation becoming  It,  a  sermon  (London,  1830)
Last Sermon  Preached  in  the  Old  Church  of Thurso  (Thurso,  1832,  1833,  and  1841)
Assembly  Addresses  (p.p.,  n.p.,  1884)
Sermon on  Psalm  LXXXV.,  10  (p.p.)
Account  of the  Parish  (New  Statistical  Account,  xv.)
Sermon XLIV.  (Free  Church  Pulpit,  i.)
Sermons and  Assembly  Addresses  in  Memorials  of Caithness  Ministers.

Family
He was twice married. His first wife was Isabella Murray, daughter of William Murray of Pitcalzean, whom he married in 1833.
Their only son out of five children was Rev Walter Ross Taylor (1838–1907) who was father in turn to Walter Ross-Taylor MP.

His son Walter was Moderator in 1900 and oversaw the critical Union with the United Presbyterian Church of Scotland.

He  married:
(1)  9 May  1833,  Isobel  (died  March  1884),  second daughter  of  William  Murray  of  Pitcalzean, Ross,  and  sister  of  William  Murray  of  Geanies, and  had  issue — 
Christina  Barbara  Ross, born  28  July  1834  (married  1857,  Alexander Auld,  minister  of  Free  Church,  Olrig)
Flora Ross,  born  14  May  1836  (married  F.  R. Johnstone)
Walter  Ross,  D.D.,  minister of Kelvinside  United  Free  Church,  Glasgow, Moderator  of  the  Free  Church  General Assembly  in  1900,  born  11  April  1838, died  6  December  1907
Esther  Murray,  born 13  June  1841  (married  Alexander  Middleton, Rose  Farm,  Invergordon)
Jemima  Alexa, born  11  March  1843  (married  Provost William  Mackay,  Thurso)
(2)  23 March 1887, (aged 82), Isabella  (born  25  October  1843,  died  6 April  1928),  daughter  of  William  Macdonald, Pennyland,  Thurso.

References

Citations

Sources

1805 births
1896 deaths
People from Tain
People from Ross and Cromarty
19th-century Ministers of the Free Church of Scotland